Extension is the third album by composer/arranger/keyboardist Clare Fischer, and his first for big band, recorded and released in 1963 on the Pacific Jazz label, reissued on CD (together with the 1967 LP, Songs for Rainy Day Lovers) in 2002 as America the Beautiful, and, under its original name, in 2012.

According to Ed Beach, disk jockey of the WRVR 106.7 FM New York radio program “Just Jazz,” on this album, all of the solos, except for those of Clare Fischer and tenor saxophonist Jerry Coker, were written out (by Fischer), not improvised.

Reception
Reviewing the 2012 CD reissue for All About Jazz, Troy Collins calls Extension Fischer's "masterpiece," representing "a majestic culmination of his concepts, drawing upon myriad influences, including rich Ellingtonian voicings, the angular harmonic intervals of bebop, and bold modernist innovations proffered by classical composers such as Béla Bartók and Dmitri Shostakovich." Expanding on this notion, Collins continues:
Counter to the norms of the time, these meticulously scored big-band charts are light on extended improvisation—but intentionally so—as Fischer considered the relationship between composition and arrangement equally important. Maintaining thematic control as primary soloist, Fischer proves to be a concise, yet original interpreter, demonstrated by his adroit pianism on the impressionistic tone poem "Quiet Dawn." His kaleidoscopic Hammond organ work, revealed elsewhere on the record, is equally colorful.
Alternating with the leader for the spotlight is tenor saxophonist Jerry Coker... Together Fischer and Coker accentuate the date's prismatic colors and variegated moods, which are by turns charmingly old fashioned, like the breezy "Ornithardy," or subversively modern, such as the jaunty "Igor," dedicated to Stravinsky. As part of the same continuum that includes Gil Evans, Stan Kenton and Gary McFarland, Fischer reveals a distinctive and unique compositional style. Accessible and sophisticated, Extension is a welcome reissue that will entertain and engage curious listeners on multiple levels.

Track listing

All compositions by Clare Fischer.

 "Ornithardy" - 3:29
 "Quiet Dawn" - 4:36
 "Bittersweet" - 3:43
 "Igor" - 3:23
 "Extension" - 6:32
 "Solette" - 1:08
 "Passacaglia" - 3:16                                          
 "Canto Africano" - 3:54

Personnel

Ornithardy, Extension, Soloette / Passacaglia

Bud Shank - flute, alto saxophone
Don Shelton - alto saxophone, clarinet
Jerry Coker - tenor saxophone
Gary Foster - tenor saxophone, clarinet
John Lowe - E-flat contrabass clarinet, baritone saxophone, clarinet, piccolo
Gil Falco - tenor trombone
Bob Knight - bass trombone
Vincent DeRosa - 1st horn
Richard Perissi - 2nd horn
Fred Teuber - 3rd horn
Tommy Johnson - tuba
Clare Fischer - piano, organ, alto saxophone
Bob West - bass
Larry Bunker - drums

Quiet Dawn, Bittersweet, Igor, Canto Africano
John Lowe - 1st flute, alto flute, piccolo
Sam Most - 2nd flute, alto flute, piccolo
Gary Foster - alto clarinet, tenor saxophone
Louis Ciotti - clarinet
Ben Kantor - clarinet
Don Shelton - E-flat clarinet, alto saxophone
Jerry Coker - bass clarinet
Jack Nimitz - E-flat contrabass clarinet, baritone saxophone
Gil Falco - tenor trombone
Bob Knight - bass trombone
Vincent DeRosa - 1st horn
Richard Perissi - 2nd horn
Fred Teuber - 3rd horn
Tommy Johnson - tuba
Larry Bunker - vibraphone
Clare Fischer - piano, organ, lujon
Bob West - bass
Colin Bailey - drums

References 

1963 albums
Big band albums
Clare Fischer albums
Pacific Jazz Records albums